Grootfontein Constituency is an electoral constituency in the Otjozondjupa Region of Namibia. It had 21,595 inhabitants in 2004 and 16,629 registered voters . The constituency consists of the town of Grootfontein and the surrounding rural area.

Politics
The 2015 regional election was won by Nelao Delemine Amagulu of the SWAPO Party with 3,521 votes, followed by Paulus Bernardt Wimmerth of the Democratic Turnhalle Alliance (DTA) with 1,149 votes and Wendelinus Kweruje Limbu of the All People’s Party (APP) with 267 votes. The SWAPO candidate also won the 2020 regional election. Elder Fernando Filipe received 2,829 votes, while Matias Joseph of the Independent Patriots for Change (IPC), a party formed in August 2020, obtained 1,044 votes. Wimmerth of the Popular Democratic Movement (PDM, the new name of the DTA) came third with 790 votes.

References

Constituencies of Otjozondjupa Region
States and territories established in 1992
1992 establishments in Namibia